Wadkins is a surname. Notable people with the surname include:

Bobby Wadkins (born 1951), American golfer, brother of Lanny
Lanny Wadkins (born 1949), American golfer

See also
Watkins (surname)